The 26th Awit Awards were held in Sequoia Hotel, Quezon City. They honored the best of Filipino music for the year 2012. The Philippine Association of the Record Industry decided to hold a small event, where only the winners were invited, due to the tragic Typhoon Yolanda (Haiyan) that affected the country last month. The money to be used for the planned extravagant awards ceremony was instead donated to the calamity fund. Being a simple ceremony, no performances occurred.

Nominees were announced on June 3, 2013. Alwyn Cruz led the pack with eight nominations. He was followed by Jonathan Manalo with seven. Gloc-9 and Vic Valenciano came next receiving six nods.

Gloc-9 and Angeline Quinto won most of the awards with three. For the third consecutive time, Ronnie Ricketts was given a certificate of appreciation again for his campaign against piracy.

Winners and nominees
Winners are listed first and highlighted in bold. Nominated producers, composers and lyricists are not included in this list, unless noted. For the full list, please go to their official website.

Performance Awards

Creativity Awards

Technical Achievement Awards

Digital Awards

Note:

The awards were given specifically to the composers, instead of the recording artists/groups.

Special Award

References

External links
 Official Website of the Awit Awards

Awit Awards
2013 music awards
Awit